The Bicaz is a right tributary of the river Bistrița in Romania. Its source is in the Hășmaș Mountains. Its uppermost course, upstream from Red Lake (Lacul Roșu), is also called Vereșchiu. Other tributaries of Lacul Roșu are Pârâul Oii (Oaia), Licoș and Suhard. It discharges into the Bistrița in the town Bicaz. The Romanian name derives from the Hungarian name, which means literally frog-rivulet (hun.: béka = frog).

The main tributaries of the river are:
 Left bank tributaries: Licoș, Suhard, Cupaș, Lapoș, Șugău, Țepeșeni, Capra (or Pârâul Jidanului), Chișirig, Pârâul Izvorului, Neagra, Tașca, Hamzoaia
 Right bank tributaries: Pârâul Oii, Bicăjel, Bardoș, Surduc, Dămuc, Ticoș, Floarea, Secu

The Bicaz Gorge is part of the Cheile Bicazului-Hășmaș National Park.

References

Rivers of Romania
Rivers of Harghita County
Rivers of Neamț County